Everett Jones may refer to the following people:

Everett Holland Jones, Bishop of West Texas
Everett Leroy Jones, birth name of American writer Amiri Baraka